The 1981–82 National Hurling League was the 51st season of the National Hurling League.

Division 1

Cork came into the season as defending champions of the 1980-81 season. Carlow entered Division 1 as the promoted team.

On 18 April 1982, Kilkenny won the title after a 2-14 to 1-11 win over Wexford in the final. It was their 5th league title overall and their first since 1975-76.

Division 1A table

Group stage

Division 1B table

Group stage

Play-offs

Knock-out stage

Quarter-finals

Semi-finals

Final

Scoring statistics

Top scorers overall

Division 2

Table

References

National Hurling League seasons
League
League